Phalacronotus is a genus of sheatfishes native to Asia

Species
There are currently four recognized species in this genus:
Phalacronotus apogon (Bleeker, 1851) (Metallic sheatfish)
Phalacronotus bleekeri (Günther, 1864) (Bleeker's sheatfish)
Phalacronotus micronemus (Bleeker, 1846)
Phalacronotus parvanalis (Inger & Chin, 1959)

As food

See also
List of Thai ingredients

References

External links

WORMS - Phalacronotus
EOL - Phalacronotus
Phalacronotus bleekeri (Günther, 1864)
Phalacronotus apogon (Bleeker, 1851)
Zipcodezoo
Pla Nua On

Siluridae
Fish of Asia
Catfish genera
Freshwater fish genera
Taxa named by Pieter Bleeker